South Korea competed at the 1999 World Championships in Athletics from August 21 to 29. A team of 8 athletes was announced in preparation for the competition.

Results

Men

Women

References
1999 championship Results. 

World Championships in Athletics
1999
Nations at the 1999 World Championships in Athletics